Danzer, also spelled Dänzer in German, is a surname. Notable people with the name include:

Emmerich Danzer (born 1944), Austrian former figure skater
Frieda Dänzer (1930–2015), Swiss alpine skier
Georg Danzer (1946–2007), Austrian singer-songwriter
George Danzer (born 1983), German professional poker player
Gerald Danzer (born 1938), American historian
Ludwig Danzer (1927–2011), German geometer

See also
 Denzer (disambiguation)